Belyta is a genus of diapriid wasps.

See also 
 List of diapriid genera

References 

 Macek, J. 1996: Revision of the European species of Belyta Jurine. Sbornik Narodniho Muzea v Praze Rada B Prirodni Vedy, 51(1-4): 1–22.

Hymenoptera genera
Parasitica